Rashard is a given name. Notable people with the name include:

Rashard Anderson (born 1977), former American football cornerback in the NFL
Rashard Cook (born 1977), former professional American football safety in the NFL
Rashard Griffith (born 1974), American professional basketball player
Rashard Lawrence (born 1998), American football player
Rashard Lewis (born 1979), American professional basketball player
Rashard Marshall (born 1982), American cricketer
Rashard Mendenhall (born 1987), American football running back
Rashard Odomes (born 1996), American basketball player in the Israeli Basketball Premier League

See also

Rayshard, given name